Marking axe or marking hatchet is a small hatchet which is used by forest workers to mark trees designated for logging or for thinning.  These axes were used also for trail blazing or for marking the ends of the felled logs for identification of the owner (stamping axe).

Usage
A hole in the bark is first cut with the axe and then the hammer part was hit on the spot and a raised die on the head would create a stamp on the mark. The hammer would create  a recognizable marking to show the owner or buyer of the tree.  After marking all the trees on a stand it would be ready for cutting.  Felled logs could be marked also with a log marking hammer which was used on the end of the logs. Nowadays the marks on standing trees are done usually with paint.

References

External links 
 Yesteryearstools' glossary of terms associated with axes, edge tools and their associated uses and manufacture, including logging and lumbering (with related terms along with older usage and spelling alternatives)
 Ontario Tree Marking Guide

Axes